Charles George Hamilton (born January 18, 1939) is a Canadian former professional ice hockey forward who played four games in the National Hockey League for the Montreal Canadiens and St. Louis Blues during the 1961–62 and 1972–73 seasons. The rest of his career, which lasted from 1959 to 1973, was spent in the minor leagues.

Career statistics

Regular season and playoffs

External links
 

1939 births
Living people
Canadian expatriate ice hockey players in the United States
Canadian ice hockey coaches
Canadian ice hockey forwards
Denver Spurs (WHL) players
Hershey Bears coaches
Hershey Bears players
Hull-Ottawa Canadiens players
Ice hockey people from Ontario
Montreal Canadiens players
Peterborough Petes (ice hockey) players
St. Louis Blues players
Sportspeople from Kirkland Lake